Cole Cassels (born May 4, 1995) is an American professional ice hockey centre currently playing for the Belleville Senators of the American Hockey League (AHL).

Playing career
With early years spent with the Ohio AAA Blue Jackets, he played junior ice hockey for the Oshawa Generals, winning the Memorial Cup with the team in 2015. He was selected by the Vancouver Canucks in the third round (85th overall) in 2013. He signed an entry-level contract with the Canucks in 2013.

At the conclusion of his rookie contract with the Canucks having played exclusively with American Hockey League affiliate, the Utica Comets, Cassels was not tendered a qualifying offer by the Canucks and was free to pursue free agency on June 25, 2018.

On July 31, 2018, Cassels signed his first contract abroad, agreeing to a one-year deal with German outfit, Grizzlys Wolfsburg of the DEL. In his only season with the Grizzlys in 2018–19, Cassels registered 23 points through 50 games, before leaving at the conclusion of the regular season as a free agent on March 8, 2019.

Approaching the 2019–20 season, he returned to the AHL in attending the Belleville Senators training camp. Upon his release from Belleville, Cassels resumed his North American career, agreeing to a contract with the Utah Grizzlies of the ECHL on October 2, 2019. He played 7 games with the Grizzlies, amassing 10 points before he returned to Belleville on a professional tryout contract on November 1, 2019. Cassels made 24 appearances with Belleville, contributing with 3 goals and 8 points, before leaving for fellow AHL club, the Wilkes-Barre/Scranton Penguins in securing an AHL contract for the remainder of the season on January 4, 2020.

At the conclusion of his contract with the Penguins, Cassels as a free agent opted to continue within the Senators organization, returning to Belleville on a one-year AHL contract on October 29, 2020.

On July 30, 2021, Cassels extended his career in the AHL, agreeing to a one-year contract with the Cleveland Monsters, affiliate to the Columbus Blue Jackets.

As a free agent from the Monsters organization, Cassels left for Europe for the second time in his career, agreeing to a one-year contract with Swedish club, Södertälje SK of the HockeyAllsvenskan on July 26, 2022. Cassels registered just 2 assists through 13 games to start the 2022–23 season with Södertälje SK, before opting to leave Sweden and return to the AHL in signing a one-year contract for a second stint with the Belleville Senators on November 2, 2022.

Personal life
Cassels is the son of former NHL player Andrew Cassels.
Cole spent most of his childhood living in Dublin, Ohio. He was born in Hartford, when his father was a member of the Hartford Whalers.

Career statistics

Regular season and playoffs

International

References

External links

1995 births
American men's ice hockey centers
Belleville Senators players
Cleveland Monsters players
Ice hockey players from Ohio
Living people
Oshawa Generals players
People from Dublin, Ohio
Södertälje SK players
Utah Grizzlies (ECHL) players
Utica Comets players
Vancouver Canucks draft picks
Grizzlys Wolfsburg players
Wilkes-Barre/Scranton Penguins players